Frederick Charles Roberts (1905 – 1988) was a Northern Irish footballer who played as a forward in the Irish Football League for Glentoran and Distillery. He was also capped once for Ireland.

Roberts is best known for his time at Glentoran, where during season 1930–31 he scored 96 goals in competitive matches, a record in British football. 55 of these goals were scored in the league, whilst the other 41 came in the four domestic cup competitions. He went on to score a total of 332 goals for The Glens, before being transferred to Distillery in 1933. He was selected to play for Ireland once, in a scoreless draw against Scotland in 1931.

Honours
Glentoran
 Irish Football League (1):1930–31
 Irish Cup (2): 1931–32, 1932–33
 City Cup (1): 1931–32
 County Antrim Shield (1): 1930–31

Distillery
 City Cup (1): 1933–34

See also 
 List of men's footballers with 500 or more goals

References 

1905 births
Association footballers from Belfast
1988 deaths
Association football forwards
Glentoran F.C. players
Lisburn Distillery F.C. players
Pre-1950 IFA international footballers
Association footballers from Northern Ireland